The 2022–23 UCI Track Cycling season is the eighteenth season of the UCI Track Cycling Season. The 2022–23 season began on 22 October 2022 with the GP Norway and will end in October 2023 with 2023 UCI Track Cycling World Championships. It is organised by the Union Cycliste Internationale.

Events

National Championships

Individual Pursuit

Scratch

Keirin

Sprint

Tempo Race

Points Race

Time Trial

Elimination Race

Omnium

Madison

Team Sprint

Team Pursuit

References

2022 in track cycling
2023 in track cycling
Track cycling by year
Track